USS Narkeeta may refer to the following ships of the United States Navy:

  was a tug boat that served primarily in the New York area during the Spanish–American War and World War I.
  duties included tugging, towing, and firefighting, for the 11th Naval District, during World War II.

United States Navy ship names